San Jacinto High School can refer to:

 San Jacinto High School (San Jacinto, California)
 San Jacinto High School (Houston, Texas)